The 2022–23 Copa de la Reina de Fútbol is the 41st edition of the Spanish women's association football national cup organized by the Royal Spanish Football Federation (RFEF). Barcelona are the defending champions, having won the last three editions.

Schedule and format
All ties are played in a single-match decider at a home ground. All matches ending in a tie will be decided in extra time; and if it persists, by a penalty shootout.

First round

Draw
The draw was completed by the RFEF on 7 September 2022, at the Ciudad del Fútbol de Las Rozas in Madrid.

Matches

Second round

Draw
The draw was completed by the RFEF on 4 October 2022, at the Ciudad del Fútbol de Las Rozas in Madrid.

Matches

Third round

Draw
The draw was completed by the RFEF on 21 October 2022, at the Ciudad del Fútbol de Las Rozas in Madrid.

Matches

Round of 16

Draw
The draw was completed by the RFEF on 25 November 2022, at the Ciudad del Fútbol de Las Rozas in Madrid.

Matches
Barcelona and Sevilla won their matches but then were both disqualified.

Quarter-final

Draw
The draw was completed by the RFEF on 3 February 2023, at the Ciudad del Fútbol de Las Rozas in Madrid.

Barcelona and Sevilla  were eliminated by improper alignment.

Matches

Top goalscorers

References

External links
Royal Spanish Football Federation
Copa de la Reina at La Liga website

Women
Copa de la Reina
Copa de la Reina de Fútbol seasons